Berawan is an Austronesian language of Sarawak.

Dialects
 Lakiput
 Narom
 Lelak
 Dali
 Miri long teran 
 Belait
 Tutong

Distribution
Baram (Tutoh-Tinjar)
 Batu Bela (Sungai Merah )(Lower Tutoh)
 Long Terawan (Middle Tutoh)
 Long Teru (Lower Tinjar)
 Long Jegan (Middle Tinjar)
 Long Teran 
 Long Tabing
 Long Takong 
 Loagan Bunut National Park
 Long Patan 
 Long Palo (Tutoh) 
 Long Kuk

References

External links
 Kaipuleohone has an open access collection of materials (RB2-003) that includes notes  on Berawan.

Languages of Brunei
Berawan–Lower Baram languages
Languages of Malaysia
Endangered Austronesian languages